Charles Edmond Alfred Riquier (19 November 1853, Amiens – 17 January 1929, Caen) was a French mathematician.

Riquier matriculated in 1873 at the École Normale Supérieure (ENS) where he received his agrégé in mathematics in 1876. He taught from 1876 to 1878 at the Lycée de Brest and then from 1878 to 1886 at the Lycée de Caen and from 1886 to 1924 at the Université de Caen, where he retired as a professor emeritus.

After a brief leave of absence from the Lycée de Caen, Riquier received his doctorate in mathematics in 1886 from ENS at Paris with dissertation Extension à l’hyperespace de la méthode de M. Carl Neumann pour la résolution de problèmes relatifs aux fonctions de variables réelles à laplacien nul. His thesis committee consisted of Hermite (as chair), Darboux, and Picard.

In 1910 he was awarded the Poncelet Prize. In 1920 he was elected to the French Academy of Sciences as the successor to Hieronymus Zeuthen. (Eugène Fabry was elected Riquier's successor in 1931.)

Riquier, Maurice Janet, Joseph Miller Thomas, Joseph Fels Ritt, and Ellis Kolchin were among the greatest pioneers of differential algebra and symbolic computation for systems of partial differential equations.

Selected publications

with Charles Méray:

References

External links
Author: Riquier, Charles, 5 Documents, Livres Numériques Mathématiques - Digital Math Books, sites.mathdoc.fr

1853 births
1929 deaths
People from Amiens
19th-century French mathematicians
20th-century French mathematicians
PDE theorists
École Normale Supérieure alumni
Members of the French Academy of Sciences